Calvert was a railway station at Calvert, Buckinghamshire on the former Great Central Main Line between Manchester Piccadilly and London Marylebone. The station was opened in 1899 and closed to passengers in 1963 and goods in 1964.

History 
The station and line between Brackley and Quainton Junction were constructed by Walter Scott and Company of Newcastle upon Tyne. Although the station was named Calvert, no such place existed at the time and the name was that of the local landowner, Sir Harry Verney, who had been born a Calvert but changed his name upon succeeding to the Verney Baronetcy.

At the time, Calvert was a very rural settlement with the few houses making up the village being situated close to the station and nearby brickworks, which was the largest employer in the area. In Great Central style, the station had a single island platform located below a road overbridge, from the centre of which a staircase led down to the platform; the centre piers of the bridge were left hollow to provide lamp rooms. The design was chosen as it would allow the track to be quadrupled if ever required.

A connecting spur, brought into use on 14 September 1940, linked the OxfordCambridge Varsity Line with the Great Central at Calvert, allowing much of the freight which used the Verney JunctionQuainton Road section to be diverted over the Great Central. Calvert was to remain open a further 23 years before closing to passengers on 4 March 1963, the same day as nearby Quainton Road. Fast passenger trains continued to pass through the station until 1966 when the Great Central Main Line was closed.

Routes

Present and future
The  station buildings have long since been demolished, the track through the station was lifted in 2021 and the platforms were demolished in May 2022. The stationmaster's house stands nearby.

The line of  High Speed 2 is under construction and will pass through the site of the disused station. This location (called 'Thame Road') and a fall-back site, 'Great Pond' were announced in December 2010 as the site for the HS2 maintenance depot. The nearby Calvert Waste Plant has also been identified for heat and power generation. A railhead at Calvert is being used to deliver construction materials for High Speed 2.

Just to the north of the former station site, the route of the former Varsity Line is being rebuilt as East West Rail, which will pass over HS2 and provide rail access to its planned Calvert Infrastructure Maintenance Depot. The original scope of this section of EWR included reopening the branch line to : , this element is 'under review'. There are no plans for a station.

External links
Great Central Main Line photos, including a sign formerly at Calvert and 1900s / 2006 photos of the station house

References

Disused railway stations in Buckinghamshire
Former Great Central Railway stations
Railway stations in Great Britain opened in 1899
Railway stations in Great Britain closed in 1964
1899 establishments in England
1964 disestablishments in England